Joaquín de Orbegoso Seoane (24 June 1979) is a Peruvian actor of Spanish descent most known for his role in the TV series Al Fondo Hay Sitio.

He starred in the soap operas Ana Cristina (2011) and Corazón de fuego (2011–12). He starred in the musical West Side Story (2011) as Riff Lorton.

He is the son of Guillermo de Orbegoso Orbegoso and Regina Seoane Morla, and half brother of the actress Katia Condos. He studied Psychology at the Pontificia Universidad Católica del Perú.

Filmography

Theatre
 Sólo por miedo (2004)
 Actos indecentes: los tres juicios de Oscar Wilde (2005)
 Manzanas para recordar (2005)
 Círculo de Arena (2006)
 Adiós al camino amarillo (2007)
 Canta la cloaca (2007)
 Chau Misterix (2008)
 Don't Worry Blue Eyes (2008) as Kurt Cobain.
 Cuatro amigos en busca de la chompa perdida (2008)
 ¿Donde está el idiota? (2009)
 L'Eden Cinema (2009)
 Incierto Concierto (2009)
 El enfermo imaginario (2010)
 Escuela de Payasos (2010)
 West Side Story (2011) as Riff Lorton.
 Escuela de Payasos (2011)
 Sueños de un seductor (2013) as Bill.
 L'Eden Cinema (2013)

References

1979 births
Peruvian male musical theatre actors
Peruvian people of Spanish descent
Living people
Male actors from Lima
Peruvian male television actors
21st-century Peruvian male actors